Federico Cafiero (24 May 1914 – 7 May 1980) was an Italian mathematician known for his contributions in real analysis, measure and integration theory, and in the theory of ordinary differential equations. In particular, generalizing the Vitali convergence theorem, the Fichera convergence theorem and previous results of Vladimir Mikhailovich Dubrovskii, he proved a necessary and sufficient condition for the passage to the limit under the sign of integral: this result is, in some sense, definitive. In the field of ordinary differential equations, he studied existence and uniqueness problems under very general hypotheses for the left member of the given first order equation, developing an important approximation method and proving a fundamental uniqueness theorem.

Life and academic career

Cafiero was born in Riposto, Province of Catania, on May 24, 1914. He obtained his Laurea in mathematics, cum laude, from the University of Naples Federico II in 1939. During the 1939–1940 academic year, he won an  "Istituto Nazionale di Alta Matematica" scholarship and went in Rome to the institute: there he followed the courses held by Francesco Severi, Mauro Picone, Luigi Fantappiè, Giulio Krall and Leonida Tonelli.

The World War II years: 1941–1943

He was appointed instructor of the course of "Elementi di matematica" by the Faculty of Statistical Sciences of the University of Rome, for the 1940–1941 academic year: however, he was able to hold the course only for few months, since he was called to arms in January 1941 and stationed from May 1942 to September 1943 on the Northern African coasts as an officer of the San Marco Battalion. It was there that, after having successfully completed a dangerous sabotage operation, the Armistice between Italy and Allied armed forces surprised him and the other members of his unit, leaving them without any support. Nonetheless, in desperate conditions, he was able to lead his men to the Italian coasts with a rubber dinghy, and was awarded of a Silver Medal of Military Valor for this act.

Rebuilding and researching: the years from 1944 to 1953

Being discharged from Military Service in February 1944, he was not able to reach Rome and remained in Napoli. The institution which currently is the Institute of Mathematics of the University of Naples was on the way of reconstituting, the eight former mathematics institutes of the university having been literally "torn to pieces" by the Allied forces Military Police. It was necessary to collect and reorder in a new library all the volumes of the previously existed ones, then piled on the floor of a single room, catalogue them ex novo and create new records, provide the library administration, and of course there was no administrative personnel available nor financial resources. It was also necessary to organize courses and exams for the numerous war veterans coming back from the front and for new students, with more than a half of the teaching personnel blocked beyond the Gothic Line: and in performing all those task Cafiero, jointly with few others and working as an adjunct professor of "Esercitazioni di Matematiche", was an outstanding collaborator of Renato Caccioppoli and Carlo Miranda.

Also in 1944 he married Jole Giorgini, his lifelong companion, and soon after they had a daughter, Anna.

Due to the scarce possibilities of being hired permanently by the Faculty of Sciences at that time, he accepted a position as adjunct assistant professor to the chair of Financial Mathematics, working with Luigi Lordi first at the Istituto Universitario Navale and then to the Faculty of Economics and Business, where he was appointed full assistant professor in June 1949. Nonetheless, his ties with the Faculty of Sciences remained strong, being employed there as adjunct professor of "Esercitazioni di Matematiche" several times, during those years: he was likewise assigned to several other courses related to Financial Mathematics by the Istituto Universitario Navale and by the Faculty of Business and Economics.

The scientific aspect of the collaboration with the Faculty of Sciences was nonetheless very intense, leading him to the "libera docenza" in March 1951, and to a full professorship chair in 1953: during this period, his scientific activity was done side by side at first with Carlo Miranda and later with Renato Caccioppoli, who found in him a dear pupil and friend.

Ranked first of the three winners of the competition for the chair of mathematical analysis of the University of Catania, in December 1953 he was appointed as extraordinary professor to that chair, and left Napoli for Catania.

First in Catania and then in Pisa: the years from 1954 to 1959

Cafiero started his service at the University of Catania in January 1954. His arrival at the university brought several innovations, both in teaching and in the research activity on mathematical analysis. In particular, he established a seminar on abstract measure theory open to assistant professors and to graduate students as well, and this was felt as true scientific revolution: he held the chair of mathematical analysis for three years. After becoming ordinary professor in 1956, he went to the University of Pisa on request by Sandro Faedo: during his stay, he held courses also at the Scuola Normale Superiore, becoming director of the "Leonida Tonelli" Institute and member of Board of directors of the Centro Studi Calcolatrici Elettroniche.

Work

Research activity

Teaching activity

Selected publications

The papers of Federico Cafiero listed in this section are also included in his "Opere scelte" , which collect all his published notes and one of his books. 
, is the first paper where Federico Cafiero states and proves his convergence theorem.
, is the prize winning first monograph where Federico Cafiero states and proves his convergence theorem.
, is a definitive monograph on integration and measure theory: the treatment of the limiting behavior of the integral of various kind of sequences of measure-related structures (measurable functions, measurable sets, measures and their combinations) is somewhat conclusive.
. Federico Cafiero's "Selected works", including all his published papers, tree postcards from his master Renato Caccioppoli concerning his research and his book "Lezioni sulla teoria delle funzioni di variabili reali" (.

See also
Carathéodory's existence theorem
Dominated convergence theorem
Peano existence theorem
Picard–Lindelöf theorem

Notes

References

Biographical and general references

. The "Yearbook 2015" of the Accademia Pontaniana, published by the academy itself and describing its past and present hierarchies and its activities. It also gives some notes on its history, the full list of its members and other useful information.
.
 of the book . The short "Introduction" to Cafiero's selected works by its editors: it includes also a few biographical data.
. The chapter on Cafiero in a book collecting brief biographical sketches and bibliographies of scientific production of the mathematicians who worked at the Parthenope University of Naples, during their stay at the renowned Neapolitan University.
. "Leonida Tonelli and the Pisa mathematical school" is a survey of the work of Tonelli in Pisa and his influence on the development of the school, presented at the International congress in occasion of the celebration of the centenary of birth of Mauro Picone and Leonida Tonelli (held in Rome on May 6–9, 1985). The Author was one of his pupils and, after his death, held his chair of mathematical analysis at the University of Pisa, becoming dean of the faculty of sciences and then rector: he exerted a strong positive influence on the development of the university.
. Includes a publication list.
, is a short history of the Department of Mathematics of the University of Catania: the Author briefly describes the positive contribution of Federico Cafiero to the research and teaching activity during his stay.
, is the obituary of the first doctoral student of Federico Cafiero.
, is the "Last lesson" of Mario Marino. It is a brief historical paper on the chairs of mathematical analysis at the University of Catania: one of these chairs was held by Federico Cafiero for two years, and the paper gives several brief remarks on his work.
.
.
, is a work on the didactics of mathematics, remarking the usefulness of physical models of e.g. curves and surfaces of various kind. It includes a brief remark on the "Bourbakist" style of teaching of Federico Cafiero by the first author.
.
. This is a monographic fascicle published on the "Bollettino della Unione Matematica Italiana", describing the history of the "Istituto Nazionale di Alta Matematica Francesco Severi" from its foundation in 1939 to 2003. It was written by Gino Roghi and includes a presentation by Salvatore Coen and a preface by Corrado De Concini. It is almost exclusively based on sources from the institute archives: the wealth and variety of materials included, jointly with its appendices and indexes, make this monograph a useful reference not only for the history of the institute itself, but also for the history of many mathematicians who taught or followed the institute courses or simply worked there.
. The "Yearbook 2014" of the Società Nazionale di Scienze Lettere e Arti in Napoli, published by the society itself and describing its past and present hierarchies, and its activities. It also reports some notes on its history, the full list of its members and other useful information.
.
.
.

References describing his scientific contributions
. "Real analysis and measure theory in Naples: R. Caccioppoli, C. Miranda and F. Cafiero" (English translation of the title) is the opening address of the 1988 academic year of the Società Nazionale di Scienze, Lettere ed Arti in Napoli: it describes the contributions of Caccioppoli, Miranda and Cafiero to real analysis and measure theory during their stay in Naples.
 (reviews of the symposium papers, see below): a collection of papers detailing his personality and his research, including the introduction to his "Opere scelte" (Selected works), a list of contributions from the "International Symposium Renato Caccioppoli" held in Napoli on September 20–22, 1989, a conference held by Caccioppoli himself and related letters by Carlo Miranda, Giovanni Prodi and Francesco Severi. This paper, "Measure theory in Naples: Renato Caccioppoli", appeared in the proceedings of the symposium, details Cacioppoli's and Cafiero's contributions to the development of Measure Theory.
, is a survey paper by Gaetano Fichera, describing the development of infinitesimal calculus during the twentieth century and trying to trace possible scenarios for its future evolution.
, is, according to its Author, an exposition of classical topics in Measure Theory that, despite their conceptual relevance and potential applicability, are rarely taught in current (2012) Italian university courses. 

External links 

.

1914 births
1980 deaths
People from Riposto
20th-century Italian mathematicians
Measure theorists
Mathematical analysts
Mathematicians from Sicily